Quşçu or Kushchu may refer to:
Quşçu (settlement), Azerbaijan
Quşçu Ayrım, Azerbaijan
Quşçu Körpüsü, Azerbaijan
Quşçu, Dashkasan, Azerbaijan
Quşçu, Goygol, Azerbaijan
Quşçu, Lachin, Azerbaijan
Quşçu, Shamakhi, Azerbaijan
Quşçu, Tovuz, Azerbaijan
Quşçu, Yevlakh, Azerbaijan

Seo also 
 Quşçular (disambiguation)